The  is a Japanese law on nature conservation intended to protect rare species and ecosystems. The law was passed in 1992 and entered into force the following year.

The Act provides the legal framework for the domestic designation of Endangered Species and Natural Habitat Conservation Areas as well as for the honouring of international commitments under the Washington Convention (CITES) and conventions and agreements [ja] on migratory birds, including the 1972 Japan-U.S Migratory Birds Convention, 1973 Japan-Russia Migratory Birds Convention, and 1974 Japan–Australia Migratory Bird Agreement.

Legislation repealed
The Act supersedes and repeals the 1972  (Act No. 49) and 1987  (Act No. 58).

Contents
The Act has six chapters and sixty-six articles, as well as a number of supplementary provisions:
Chapter I — General Provisions (Articles 1–6)
Chapter II — Treatment of Individual Organisms (Articles 7–33)
Chapter III — Habitat Protection (Articles 34–44)
Chapter IV — Rehabilitation of Natural Habitat, Maintenance of Viable Populations (Articles 45–48)
Chapter V — Miscellaneous Provisions (Articles 49–57)
Chapter VI — Penal Provisions (Articles 58–66)
Supplementary Provisions

See also
 Nature Conservation Law (Wilderness Areas, Nature Conservation Areas)
 Natural Parks Law (Natural Parks, including National Parks)
 Wildlife Protection and Hunting Law (Wildlife Protection Areas)
 Law for the Protection of Cultural Properties (Natural Monuments)
 Protected Forests, Protected Water Surfaces
 Japanese Red List

References

External links
  1992 Act (e-gov.go.jp)
  English translation (Ministry of Justice)
  Nature Conservation Laws (Ministry of the Environment)

Japanese legislation
Environmental law in Japan
Nature conservation in Japan
1992 in law